Copernicia berteroana (dyaré, yarey) is a palm which is endemic to Hispaniola; it is also reported from Curaçao and Venezuela, but it is probably naturalized there.

Description
Like other members of this genus, C. berteroana is a fan palm.  Trees are 4 to 5 metres tall with stems 20 centimetres in diameter.  The fruit is black, 2 centimetres long and 1.8 cm in diameter.  The leaves are used for thatch.

Habitat
Copernicia berteroana is found in flat regions with low rainfall.  In Haiti it is threatened by habitat destruction.

References

berteroana
Trees of Haiti
Trees of the Dominican Republic 
Plants described in 1908
Taxa named by Odoardo Beccari